The yellow-naped snake (Furina barnardi), also known commonly as Barnard's snake, is a small  species of venomous snake in the family Elapidae. The species is native to northeastern Australia.

Etymology
The specific name, barnardi, is in honor of Australian zoologist Henry "Harry" Greensill Barnard (1869–1966).

Geographic range
F. barnardi is found in northeastern Queensland, Australia.

Habitat
The preferred natural habitats of F. barnardi are forest and rocky areas.

Description
In alcohol, the head and neck are blackish, with a yellowish patch on the nape of the neck. The body is uniformly reddish brown dorsally, and uniformly yellowish ventrally.

Behavior
A nocturnal species, F. barnardi shelters during the day under leaf litter and fallen logs, and in burrows and soil cracks.

Diet
F. barnardi preys upon skinks, especially those of the genus Sphenomorphus.

Reproduction
F. barnardi is oviparous. Clutch size is 7–10 eggs.

References

Further reading
Cogger HG (2014). Reptiles and Amphibians of Australia, Seventh Edition. Clayton, Victoria, Australia: CSIRO Publishing. xxx + 1,033 pp. .
Kinghorn JR (1939). "Two Queensland snakes". Records of the Australian Museum 20 (4): 257–260. (Glyphodon barnardi, new species, pp. 258–259, Figures 1–2).
Wilson S, Swan G (2013). A Complete Guide to Reptiles of Australia, Fourth Edition. Sydney: New Holland Publishers. 522 pp. .

Venomous snakes
Furina
Snakes of Australia
Reptiles described in 1939